Think Visual is the twenty-second studio album by the English rock band the Kinks, released in 1986. It  peaked at #81 on the Billboard chart.

According to Ray Davies, the album was originally going to be a concept album where his "spiv" character from the "Come Dancing" music video was put in the "environment of a video shop."

Track listing

Personnel
The Kinks
Ray Davies – rhythm guitar, vocals, keyboards, harmonica
Dave Davies – lead guitar, vocals, keyboards; lead vocals on "Rock 'n' Roll Cities" and "When You Were a Child"
Ian Gibbons – keyboards, backing vocals
Jim Rodford – bass guitar, backing vocals
Bob Henrit – drums, percussion

Additional personnel
Kim Goody – backing vocals on "Think Visual"
Mick Avory – drums on "Rock 'n' Roll Cities"

Technical
Ben Fenner – engineer
Dave Powell – engineer
David Baker – engineer
Damian Korner – engineer

Cover design
Design and photography by Icon: Richard Evans and Andrew Ellis

References
Citations

Sources
 

1986 albums
The Kinks albums
London Records albums
MCA Records albums
Albums produced by Ray Davies